Dave's Picks Volume 23 is a three-CD live album by the rock band the Grateful Dead.  It contains the complete concert recorded at McArthur Court at the University of Oregon in Eugene, Oregon on January 22, 1978.  It was produced as a limited edition of 16,500 copies, and was released on August 1, 2017.

Dave's Picks Volume 23 is scheduled to be released as a five-disc LP on April 28, 2023, in a limited edition of 5,000 copies.

Critical reception

On AllMusic, Timothy Monger wrote, "Long-running Grateful Dead archival series Dave's Picks delivers a true gem on Vol. 23, featuring what many die-hard Deadheads claim to be one of the best shows of 1978... Emerging from the wild and jazzy cosmos of 'Space', Garcia and keyboardist Keith Godchaux deftly segue into a particularly spirited 'St. Stephen', which could have easily closed out an already epic show, but instead sets up a relentlessly energetic half-hour finale of 'Not Fade Away', 'Around and Around', and 'U.S. Blues'.... The newly uncovered Betty Cantor-Jackson recordings from this night finally put all the sonic pieces together on this excellent release."

Track listing
Disc 1
First set
"New Minglewood Blues" (traditional, arranged by Grateful Dead) – 6:20
"Dire Wolf" (Jerry Garcia, Robert Hunter) – 4:35
"Cassidy" (Bob Weir, John Barlow) – 5:08
"Peggy-O" (traditional, arranged by Grateful Dead) – 7:23
"El Paso" (Marty Robbins) – 5:21
"Tennessee Jed" (Garcia, Hunter) – 9:06
"Jack Straw" (Weir, Hunter) – 6:08
"Row Jimmy" (Garcia, Hunter) – 10:37
"The Music Never Stopped" (Weir, Barlow) – 8:08

Disc 2
Second set
"Bertha" > (Garcia, Hunter) – 6:52
"Good Lovin'" (Rudy Clark, Arthur Resnick) – 6:26
"Ship of Fools" (Garcia, Hunter) – 7:33
"Samson and Delilah" (traditional, arranged by Weir) – 7:48

Disc 3
"Terrapin Station" > (Garcia, Hunter) – 11:08
"Drums" > (Mickey Hart, Bill Kreutzmann) – 7:51
"The Other One" > (Weir, Kreutzmann) – 16:57
"Space" > (Garcia, Phil Lesh, Weir) – 3:52
"St. Stephen" > (Garcia, Lesh, Hunter) – 7:39
"Not Fade Away" > (Norman Petty, Charles Hardin) – 14:09
"Around and Around" (Chuck Berry) – 8:57
Encore
"U.S. Blues" (Garcia, Hunter) – 5:53

Personnel
Grateful Dead
Jerry Garcia – guitar, vocals
Donna Jean Godchaux – vocals
Keith Godchaux – keyboards
Mickey Hart – drums
Bill Kreutzmann – drums
Phil Lesh – bass, vocals
Bob Weir – guitar, vocals
Production
Produced by Grateful Dead
Produced for release by David Lemieux
Mastering: Jeffrey Norman
Recording: Betty Cantor-Jackson
Art direction, design: Steve Vance
Cover art: Dave Van Patten
Photos: Bruce Polonsky
Liner notes essay "McArthur Court Is Melting in the Oort: Close Encounters in Eugene": Jesse Jarnow
Executive producer: Mark Pinkus
Associate producers: Doran Tyson, Ivette Ramos
Tape research: Michael Wesley Johnson
Tapes provided through the assistance of ABCD Enterprises, LLC

Charts

References 

2017 live albums
23
Rhino Records live albums